Lawrence Osborne (born 1958) is a British novelist and journalist who is currently residing in Bangkok.  Osborne was educated at Fitzwilliam College, Cambridge, and at Harvard University, and has since led a nomadic life, residing for years in Poland, France, Italy, Morocco, the United States, Mexico, Thailand, and Istanbul.

Osborne has been published widely as a long-form journalist in the United States, most notably in The New York Times Magazine, The New Yorker, Gourmet, Salon, Playboy, and Condé Nast Traveler. His writings about wine and spirits appeared in a regular column called Cellar in Men's Vogue. He has also been an occasional Op-Ed columnist at Forbes.com and is a frequent contributor to Newsweek International, The Daily Beast, and The Wall Street Journal Magazine. His feature for Playboy, "Getting a Drink in Islamabad", won a 2011 Thomas Lowell Award for Travel Journalism.

He is the author of the novel Ania Malina; a book about Paris, Paris Dreambook; the essay collection The Poisoned Embrace; a controversial book about autism called American Normal: The Hidden World of Asperger Syndrome; and three subsequent travel books published by Farrar, Straus and Giroux between 2004 and 2009: a book about wine, The Accidental Connoisseur; The Naked Tourist; and an account of expatriate life in Bangkok called Bangkok Days. His short stories have appeared in many American magazines. His story "Volcano", originally published in Tin House, was selected for inclusion in The Best American Short Stories 2012. His novel The Forgiven was published in 2012 to widespread acclaim. It was selected by The Economist as one of the Best Books of the Year for 2012.
Osborne's next book, The Wet and the Dry, a travelogue about Islam and alcohol, was published in 2013. It was included in the Top 10 Books of 2013 by The New York Times Book Review critic, Dwight Garner.

Reception

Reviewing Osborne's 2004 nonfiction wine-world travelogue The Accidental Connoisseur in The New York Times, Tony Hendra wrote: "Osborne is a new voice in the wine world, smart, generous, perceptive, funny, sensible, free of cant and arrogance and self-interest."

A novel, The Ballad of a Small Player, was published by Hogarth in spring 2014 to considerable critical acclaim, both in the United States and the United Kingdom. The New York Times selected it as one of its 100 Notable Books of 2014. NPR also included it in its Year's Best Books of 2014. Paul French in the Los Angeles Review of Books wrote that "Osborne's novel is the best on contemporary China since Malraux's." Neel Mukherjee picked it as one of his Books of the Year in The New Statesman. In the London Sunday Times, Robert Collins wrote: "A modern Graham Greene.... into this relatively quiet period for British fiction, someone remarkable and unexpected has emerged fully armed with a formidable, masterly grip on the British novel. At precisely the point where most novelists start to show signs of flagging, Osborne has hit his creative, fictional stride...and has arrived as a thrilling, exceptional talent in British fiction's landscape."

His third novel, Hunters in the Dark, was published by Hogarth in May 2015 and received glowing reviews on both sides of the Atlantic. Arifa Akbar, literary editor of The Independent in London, selected it as one of her 15 Best Novels of 2015, and the novel was notably praised by Neel Mukerjee in The Guardian  and by Lee Child in The New York Times Book Review. Nishant Dahiya reviewed it for NPR. British critic David Sexton wrote in the Evening Standard: "Those comparisons with Graham Greene aren't even flattering any more." Anita Sethi reviewed it in The Guardian with praise for its stylistic finesse.

Beautiful Animals was published by Hogarth in July 2017 and was featured on the cover of The New York Times Book Review with a review by the Japanese-American novelist Katie Kitamura. In her long review of the novel in The Washington Post, Lionel Shriver wrote: "So let's not mince words. This is a great book."

Osborne was asked by the Raymond Chandler estate to write the next Philip Marlowe novel, released in 2018. Widely and favorably reviewed, Only to Sleep was selected by philosopher John Gray as his Book of the Year in the New Statesman, and was included in The New York Times 100 Most Notable Books of 2018  and NPR's Best Books of 2018. It was selected by William Boyd in the same category in The Guardian.

The Glass Kingdom was published in 2020 and was included in the New York Times Notable 100 Books of 2020. It was also reviewed at length in a profile of the author by John Gray in The New Statesman.

Films
As reported by The Hollywood Reporter, Osborne sat on the jury of the 2017 Macau Film Festival. The screen version of The Forgiven was announced at Cannes in 2018 with director John Michael McDonagh and Ralph Fiennes, Jessica Chastain and Matt Smith attached. Shooting began in Morocco in February 2020 and was completed in September of that year. The film was shown at a Gala opening at the 2021 Toronto Film Festival and will be shown at the Tribeca Festival in 2022 prior to its US release with Focus and Roadside. Beautiful Animals, to be set in Greece, is currently in development with Anonymous Content and Endeavour and The Glass Kingdom has been acquired by Apple for development as a limited series. "The Ballad of a Small Player" is also currently in development with Curzon.

In June 2020 it was announced by both Variety and The Hollywood Reporter that Osborne will script and co-produce the film adaptation of Jon Swain's 1997 Vietnam war memoir River of Time in conjunction with Indochina Productions.

A novel On Java Road, set in Hong Kong, will appear with Random House in August 2022 and a collection of short stories, Burning Angel, will be published in 2023.

Bibliography
Ania Malina (1989)
American Normal (2002)
The Accidental Connoisseur (2004)
The Naked Tourist (2006)
Bangkok Days (2009)
The Forgiven (2012)
The Wet and the Dry (2013)
The Ballad of a Small Player (2014)
Hunters in the Dark (2015)
Beautiful Animals (2017)
Only to Sleep (2018), a Philip Marlowe novel
The Glass Kingdom (2020)
On Java Road (2022)

References

External links
 

Alumni of Fitzwilliam College, Cambridge
21st-century English novelists
English male journalists
Living people
Harvard University alumni
English male novelists
21st-century English male writers
1958 births